20th Digital Studio (also known onscreen as simply 20th Digital and formerly known as Fox Digital Studio from 2008 to 2013 and Zero Day Fox from 2013 to 2020) is an American web series and web films production and distribution company founded in 2008 as a digital media, and is a subsidiary of 20th Century Studios, a division of Disney Entertainment (under Walt Disney Studios), which is itself a division of The Walt Disney Company. Their focus has evolved to funding and producing short-form genre content by new filmmakers from the digital and film festival worlds. It was established in 2008.

It has produced web series such as Vin Diesel's The Ropes, Wolfpack of Reseda, Let's Big Happy, Suit Up, Bad Samaritans, and Suit Up 2, as well as films like Shotgun Wedding. Suit Up, starring Marc Evan Jackson, is the first of the studio's shows to be picked up for a second season. It was produced in partnership with DirecTV.

20th Digital Studio is one of the 21st Century Fox studios that was acquired by Disney on March 20, 2019.

Television films and series
The Ropes (From 2011)
Wolfpack of Reseda (From 2012)
Let's Big Happy (From 2012)
Suit Up (From 2012)
Bad Samaritans (From 2013)
Suit Up 2 (From 2014)
Phenoms (From 2018)
Small Shots (From 2018)

Film
 Shotgun Wedding (From 2013)
 How to Be a Man (From 2013)
 Parallels (From 2015)
 Mono (From 2016)
Daughters of Witches (October 2021)
Grimcutty (October 2022)
Matriarch (October 2022)
Appendage (2023; co-production with Fever Dream Studios)
 Clock (2023)
 The Mill (2023)

Logo
The original Fox Digital Studio logo was created in 2007 by UK-based motion graphics and 3D artist Robert Holtby. As of 2013 Holtby updated the logo to reflect the new Fox Digital Studio rebranding, as "Zero Day Fox" and to move it more in line with the other 20th Century Fox logos created by Blue Sky Studios.

The current 20th Digital Studio logo was made in line with 20th Television's logo, following Disney's removal of the "Fox" brand from the 21st Century Fox assets acquired in 2019 to avoid confusion with Fox Corporation.

On December 1, 2022, a new intro for 20th Digital Studio was leaked from a promotional Instagram and Twitter post of Grimcutty (the structure was possibly done by Industrial Light & Magic and based on Picturemill design and also based on the Blue Sky Studios design).

References

External links

2008 establishments in California
American companies established in 2008
Mass media companies established in 2008
20th Century Studios
Film production companies of the United States
Television production companies of the United States
Entertainment companies based in California
Companies based in Los Angeles
Walt Disney Studios (division)
Disney acquisitions
Disney production studios